The women's tournament of Handball at the 2016 Summer Olympics at Rio de Janeiro, Brazil, began on 6 August and ended on 20 August 2016. Games were played at the Future Arena.

Russia won their first title after defeating France 22–19 in the final. Norway captured the bronze, and their third consecutive medal by winning against the Netherlands.

The medals were presented by Aïcha Garad Ali, Poul-Erik Høyer Larsen and Auvita Rapilla, IOC members from Djibouti, Denmark and Papua New Guinea respectively and by Hassan Moustafa, Miguel Roca Mas and Per Bertelsen, President, 1st Vice President and Caretaker Chairman of the Commission of Organizing and Competition of the IHF respectively.

Competition schedule

Qualification

Competition format
The twelve teams in the tournament were divided into two groups of six, with each team initially playing round-robin games within their group. Following the completion of the round-robin stage, the top four teams from each group advance to the quarter-finals. The two semi-final winners meet for the gold medal match, while the semi-final losers play in the bronze medal match.

Referees
15 pairs of referees were selected on 5 July 2016.

Rosters

Draw
The draw took place on 29 April 2016. The final match schedule was announced on 20 May 2016.

Seeding
The seeding was announced on 10 April 2016.

Group stage
All times are local (UTC−3).

Group A

Group B

Knockout stage

Bracket

Quarterfinals

Semifinals

Bronze medal game

Gold medal game

Ranking and statistics

Final ranking

Source: IHF

All Star Team

Source: IHF.com

Top goalscorers

Source: IHF

Top goalkeepers

Source: IHF

Medalists

References

External links
Official website

Women's tournament
Women's handball in Brazil
Olymp
2016 in Brazilian women's sport
Women's events at the 2016 Summer Olympics